The Journal of Operations Management is a peer-reviewed academic journal covering research on all aspects of operations management. It was established in 1980 and is published by  Wiley on behalf of the Association for Supply Chain Management. The editors-in-chief are Suzanne de Treville (Université de Lausanne) and Tyson Browning (Texas Christian University).

Abstracting and indexing
The journal is abstracted and indexed in:

According to the Journal Citation Reports, the journal has a 2021 impact factor of 6.720.

References

External links

8 times per year journals
Wiley (publisher) academic journals
Publications established in 1980
Business and management journals
English-language journals